"Will You Marry Me?" is a 1992 single by Paula Abdul.

Will You Marry Me? may also refer to:

Will You Marry Me? (film), a 2012 Indian romantic comedy
Will You Marry Me? (opera), a 1989 opera by Hugo Weisgall

See also
Will You Merry Me?, a 2008 American television Christmas film
Marriage proposal, an event where one person asks for the other's hand in marriage
Marry Me (disambiguation)